Madiha Rizvi is a Pakistani actress. She is known for her roles in dramas Kahin Deep Jaley, Aik Thi Rania, Piya Naam Ka Diya, Mere Meherbaan, Parizaad and Chaudhry and Sons. She is the daughter of film actress Deeba.

Early life
Madiha was born on December 25, 1987, in Lahore, Pakistan. Her mother, Deeba Rizvi, has been a film actress since 1960s. She completed her studies from University of Lahore.

Career
Rizvi made her debut as an actress in 2000 on PTV and she appeared in dramas with her mother Deeba. Then she appeared in dramas Meray Qatil Meray Dildar, Kitni Girhain Baaki Hain, Raju Rocket and Bari Aapa. She is usually typecast in the roles of sister-in-law or elder sister such as Aatish, Bandhay Aik Dor Say, Kahin Deep Jaley and Parizaad. However, she portrayed different characters in Aangan and Sammi.

Personal life
Rizvi married to actor Hasan Noman in 2013 from which she has two daughters. The couple got divorced in November 2022.

Her brother Imran Rizvi is also an actor.

Filmography

Television

Telefilm

Film

References

External links
 
 
 

1987 births
Living people
Pakistani television actresses
21st-century Pakistani actresses
Pakistani film actresses